Andhra Pradesh Committee of Communist Revolutionaries was a communist group in Andhra Pradesh, India, led by Chandra Pulla Reddy. The group was formed through a split away from the original APCCR led by T. Nagi Reddy in 1971. In 1975 the organisation merged into the Communist Party of India (Marxist-Leninist) led by Satyanarayan Singh.

References

Political parties established in 1971
Defunct political parties in Andhra Pradesh
Defunct communist parties in India
Political parties disestablished in 1975
1971 establishments in Andhra Pradesh
1975 disestablishments in India